Jamie Chen Subandhi (born December 15, 1989) is an American badminton player who competes in the singles and mixed doubles category. In the mixed doubles, she is usually partnered with Phillip Chew. Subandhi won gold along with Chew in the mixed doubles category at the 2015 Pan American Games. In 2016, she competed in the mixed doubles event at the Summer Olympics in Rio de Janeiro, Brazil.

Personal life 
Subandhi is the daughter of Hengki Tedi Subandhi (father) and Maria (mother), who are of Chinese-Indonesian descent.

Achievements

Pan American Games
Women's singles

Women's doubles

Mixed doubles

Pan Am Championships
Women's singles

Mixed doubles

BWF International Challenge/Series
Women's singles

Women's doubles

Mixed doubles

 BWF International Challenge tournament
 BWF International Series tournament
 BWF Future Series tournament

References

External links 
 
 
 
 Toronto 2015

Living people
1989 births
Sportspeople from Long Beach, California
American female badminton players
American people of Chinese-Indonesian descent
American sportspeople of Chinese descent
Olympic badminton players of the United States
Badminton players at the 2016 Summer Olympics
Badminton players at the 2003 Pan American Games
Badminton players at the 2007 Pan American Games
Badminton players at the 2015 Pan American Games
Pan American Games gold medalists for the United States
Pan American Games bronze medalists for the United States
Pan American Games medalists in badminton
Medalists at the 2007 Pan American Games
Medalists at the 2015 Pan American Games
21st-century American women